"Der Wolf" is a German-language song performed by Austrian singer-songwriter and radio presenter Julian Le Play. The song was released as a digital download on 26 April 2013 as the lead single from his second studio album Melodrom (2014). The song peaked to number 47 on the Austrian Singles Chart.

Music video
A music video to accompany the release of "Der Wolf" was first released onto YouTube on 28 April 2013 at a total length of three minutes and twenty-eight seconds.

Track listing

Chart performance

Release history

References

2013 songs
2013 singles
Julian Le Play songs